Mélanie Gourarier is a French anthropologist, specializing in gender and sexuality issues. Since 2017, she has been a research fellow at the French National Centre for Scientific Research.

Life 
In 2012, Mélanie Gourarier defended a doctoral thesis in social anthropology at the École des Hautes Etudes en Sciences Sociales, entitled Seduire les femmes pour s'apprecier entre hommes. An ethnography of male sociability within the Community of Seduction in France.

Mélanie Gourarier is a teacher in the Masters in Gender, Politics and Sexuality at the School of Advanced Studies in Social Sciences and ATER at the University of Maine. Since 2017, she has been a research fellow at CNRS.

Her research focuses mainly on the question of gender, the anthropology of kinship and paternity, power relations, hegemony and the uses of genetics and bioethics. As part of the ETHOPOL program, funded by the National Research Agency from 2015 to 2019 and hosted at the University of Toulouse-Jean-Jaurès, she conducts research on the supervision and communication of DNA paternity tests in order to study the doubt in the ways of determining filiation.

She is a member of the French Association of Anthropologists.

Works 

 Niki de Saint-Phalle. Le jardin des Tarots, photographies de Laurent Condominas, Actes Sud, 112p, 2010, (ISBN 2742789197) 
 Séducteurs des rues, avec Léon Maret, Casterman, Collection : Sociorama, 158p, 2016, (ISBN 220309527X)
 Alpha mâle, Séduire les femmes pour s'apprécier entre hommes, Seuil, La Couleur des idées, 240p, 2017, (ISBN 2021290263)

References 

French anthropologists
Living people
Year of birth missing (living people)